Eth (Ð ð) is a letter of the Latin alphabet.

Eth or ETH may also refer to:

Language and linguistics 
 -eth, an archaic English suffix
 Ethiopian sign languages

Places 
 Eth, Nord, a commune in France
 Ethiopia

Science and technology 
 ETH Zurich, the Swiss Federal Institute of Technology in Zürich, Switzerland
 eth-, a chemical prefix
 Eigenstate thermalization hypothesis
 Electric train heating
 Ethereum, a cryptocurrency
 Ethernet
 Engineering and Technology History Wiki (ETHW)
 Exponential time hypothesis
 Extraterrestrial hypothesis, an explanation for UFOs

Transport 
 Eilat Airport, in Israel
 Ethiopian Airlines, the national airline of Ethiopia

Business 
 Electronic trading hours (or extended trading hours)

People and organizations
 Enter the Haggis, a Canadian celtic rock band
 Erik ten Hag, Dutch association football manager of Manchester United F.C.